Jyotirvidya Parisanstha (known as JVP to people of Pune, India and to most of the Indian amateur astronomers) is an association of amateur astronomers. On August 22, 1944 some eminent citizens of Pune formed JVP, primarily for the spread of knowledge of astronomy among the public and also to make their own contribution as far as possible. It was the first association of its kind and remained so far for a few decades. Right from conception, JVP has been actively working for the propagation of astronomy in purely scientific temperament. JVP is the first Amateur Association to Host the ALL INDIA AMATEUR ASTRONOMERS MEET in 1991 and the first All India Messier Marathon in 2012.

Science Outreach Programs

2014
Study Tour to GMRT and IUCAA Observatory  - 
Jyotirvidya Parisanstha organized a study tour to Giant meterwave Radio Telescope GMRT at Khodad, and IUCAA Girawali Observatory, Girawali; both near Narayangaon, Pune on Sunday May 25, 2014. GMRT is the world’s largest array of radio telescopes at meter wavelengths. It contains 30 fully steerable 45 meter diameter antennas arranged in ‘Y’ shape with the diameter of nearly 25 km. IUCAA Girawali Observatory has 2 meter optical and near-infrared telescope. Information given on construction and working of these telescopes. Dr. Divya Oberoi, Scientist, GMRT and Mr. Arvind Paranjpye, Director, Nehru Planetarium guided the tour.

Exhibition on Optical Observatories - 
An astronomical exhibition on “Optical Observatories - Infinity Focused with Giant Eye” was organized by Jyotirvidya Parisanstha, Pune during 19–21 September 2014 at “Jawaharlal Nehru Cultural Centre, Opposite Mahatma Phule Museum, Ghole Road, Pune” (Timing: 9 am to 8 pm). The exhibition was inaugurated on 19 September 2014 at 11.00 am. 
The objective of the exhibition was to spread the knowledge regarding the astronomical observatories with large telescopes. In 1609, Galileo Galilei used telescope for astronomical purpose for the first time and since then the telescope observatories are becoming bigger and more advance. The exhibition provided information on basics of telescope, working of big observatories, amateur observatories, etc. Exhibition consisted of posters, models of some observatories, Jyotirvidya’s telescope setups, multimedia displays, short films, etc.
Both day were busy with school students and residents and astronomy enthusiasts. Around 700 school students visited exhibition.

Photographs & Video from the event can be found on JVP's Facebook page.

References

External links

Amateur astronomy
Organizations established in 1944